The Henriette Wegner Pavilion or the Wegner Pavilion a classical tea pavilion in Frogner Park, Oslo, built in the 1820s. It is part of the Oslo Museum and is located near the manor house of Frogner Manor. It is located on a small hill on the edge of Frogner Park that is known as Utsikten ("The View"). The pavilion is listed as a protected cultural heritage site.

It was built in the 1820s at Fossum Manor at Blaafarveværket and was a gift from Blaafarveværket's director-general Benjamin Wegner to his wife Henriette Wegner (née Seyler). It was moved to Frogner Park after Wegner bought Frogner Manor in 1836.

The pavilion is shaped like a classic octagonal round temple with a colonnade. The ceiling is a painted miniature copy of the dome over the Pantheon temple in Rome, which makes the room feel larger than it actually is.

The pavilion is occasionally open to the public as an artist-run art gallery and used for smaller cultural events during the summer.

References 

Frogner Park